Andreas Martinsen (born 17 July 1990) is a Danish athlete specialising in the sprint hurdles. He represented his country at the 2016 World Indoor Championships reaching the semifinals.

His personal bests are 13.50 seconds in the 110 metres hurdles (+1.0 m/s, Copenhagen Athletics Games) and 7.68 seconds in the 60 metres hurdles (Belgrade, 2017) - both national records.

Competition record

1Did not finish in the final

References

1990 births
Living people
Danish male hurdlers
Place of birth missing (living people)
European Games competitors for Denmark
Athletes (track and field) at the 2019 European Games